First Look could refer to:

1st Look, a weekly late-night NBC series about urban culture and food
First Look (TV program), a Philippine 30-minute early morning news television program that aired on ABS-CBN
First Look Media, a news organization
First-look deal, a deal with a production company to get a first look at a project
Morning Joe First Look, a news program on MSNBC; formerly solely titled First Look